Jegarg (also Romanized as Jegārg) is a village in Biabanak Rural District, in the Central District of Khur and Biabanak County, Isfahan Province, Iran. At the 2006 census, its population was 12, in 4 families.

References 

Populated places in Khur and Biabanak County